Daniel Alejandro Juárez (born 7 January 1975, in San Salvador de Jujuy) is a footballer.

Club career
Juarez has played most of his career in the Primera División Argentina, almost entirely with Gimnasia y Esgrima de Jujuy. He then spent two seasons with Club Jorge Wilstermann in Bolivia. In September 2008, Juarez joined Alajuelense in the Primera División de Costa Rica. On March 19, 2009 he was fired due to his poor performance with LD Alajuelense.

References

External links
 Argentine Primera statistics

1975 births
Living people
Argentine footballers
Argentine expatriate footballers
Gimnasia y Esgrima de Jujuy footballers
Club Atlético Huracán footballers
C.D. Jorge Wilstermann players
Expatriate footballers in Bolivia
L.D. Alajuelense footballers
Expatriate footballers in Costa Rica
Sportspeople from Jujuy Province
Argentine expatriate sportspeople in Bolivia
Liga FPD players
Association football midfielders